This is the discography of pop duo Dollar.

Albums

Studio albums

Compilation albums

Box sets

Singles

Notes

References

Discographies of British artists
Pop music group discographies